Eiichi Itai (born 23 March 1951) is a Japanese professional golfer.

Itai played on the Japan Golf Tour, winning three times.

Professional wins (3)

Japan Golf Tour wins (3)

Japan Golf Tour playoff record (0–1)

External links

Japanese male golfers
Japan Golf Tour golfers
Sportspeople from Akita Prefecture
1951 births
Living people